Chainpur subdivision is an administrative subdivision of the Gumla district in the South Chotanagpur division in the state of Jharkhand, India.

History 
As of 2022,  Gumla district is divided into three subdivisions – Gumla subdivision (with Gumla, Ghaghra, Bharno, Bishunpur, Raidih and Sisai blocks), Basia subdivision (with Palkot, Basia and Kamdara blocks), and Chainpur subdivision (with Chainpur, Albert Ekka (Jari) and Dumri blocks).

Overview 
The subdivisions of Gumla  district have the following distinctions:

Note: Calculated on the basis of block-wise data available.

Police stations  
Police stations in the Chainpur subdivision are at: 
Chainpur 
Dumri 
Jari

Blocks   
Community development blocks in the Chainpur subdivision are:

Education    
In 2011, in the Chainpur  subdivision out of a total 197 inhabited villages in 3 CD blocks there were 62 villages with pre-primary schools, 177 villages with primary schools, 75 villages with middle schools, 15 villages with secondary schools, 3 villages with senior secondary schools, 2 villages with general degree colleges, 18  villages with no educational facility.  
.*Senior secondary schools are also known as Inter colleges in Jharkhand.

Educational institutions    
The following institution is located in Chainpur subdivision: 
Paramvir Albert Ekka Memorial College was established at Chainpur in 1975. It also has facilities for teaching in classes XI and XII.   
(Information about degree colleges with proper reference may be added here)

Healthcare    
In 2011, in the Chainpur  subdivision, in the 3 CD blocks, there were 8 villages with primary health centres, 30 villages with primary health subcentres, 9 villages with maternity and child welfare centres, 10 villages with allopathic hospitals, 6 villages with dispensaries, 1 village with a veterinary hospital, 8 villages with family welfare centres, 10 villages with medicine shops. 
.*Private medical practitioners, alternative medicine etc. not included

Medical facilities

(Anybody having referenced information about location of government/ private medical facilities may please add it here)

References    

    

Sub-divisions in Jharkhand